Appias lalage, the spot puffin, is a small butterfly of the family Pieridae, that is, the yellows and whites, which is found in India, Indochina and Hainan.

Description

See also
List of butterflies of India (Pieridae)

Notes

References
 
  Journal of the Bombay Natural History Society.

External links
 Our Common Butterflies page by Dr. PR Arun

Appias (butterfly)
Butterflies of Asia
Butterflies of Indochina
Butterflies described in 1842